Atractus lehmanni, Lehmann's ground snake, is a species of snake in the family Colubridae. The species can be found in  Ecuador, and Colombia.

References 

Atractus
Reptiles of Ecuador
Reptiles of Colombia
Snakes of South America
Reptiles described in 1898
Taxa named by Oskar Boettger